Illovo is a town in EThekwini in the KwaZulu-Natal province of South Africa.

Popular coastal resort on the Natal South Coast, between Winklespruit and Karridene, 34 km south-west of Durban. It takes its name from the Lovu River. The adapted form Illovo has also been applied to a sugar estate and thence to the Illovo Sugar company.

References

Populated places in eThekwini Metropolitan Municipality